Ramona Neubert ( Göhler, later Raulf, born 26 July 1958 in Pirna, Bezirk Dresden) is a former heptathlete from East Germany. Her biggest triumph was winning the world title at the inaugural 1983 World Championships in Helsinki, Finland. She broke the world record four times in a row during the early 1980s.

Achievements

References

1958 births
Living people
People from Pirna
People from Bezirk Dresden
German heptathletes
Sportspeople from Saxony
Olympic athletes of East Germany
World Athletics Championships athletes for East Germany
Athletes (track and field) at the 1980 Summer Olympics
World record setters in athletics (track and field)
World Athletics Championships medalists
European Athletics Championships medalists
Recipients of the Patriotic Order of Merit in silver
World Athletics Championships winners
20th-century German women